Loy Vernon Hanning (October 18, 1917 – June 24, 1986) was a Major League Baseball pitcher.

Sources

Major League Baseball pitchers
St. Louis Browns players
Fayetteville Angels players
Cedar Rapids Raiders players
Springfield Browns players
San Antonio Missions players
Toledo Mud Hens players
Baseball players from Missouri
1917 births
1986 deaths
People from Bunker, Missouri
People from Washington, Missouri